David Hosking is a British lightweight rower. He won a gold medal at the 1980 World Rowing Championships in Hazewinkel with the lightweight men's eight.

Hosking studied at Durham University and joined the Royal Navy following graduation. He is the father of Sophie Hosking.

In 2011, he formed part of a team that broke the world record for rowing across the Atlantic Ocean.

References

Year of birth missing (living people)
British male rowers
World Rowing Championships medalists for Great Britain
Alumni of Grey College, Durham
Durham University Boat Club rowers
Living people